421st may refer to:

421st Air Refueling Squadron, inactive United States Air Force unit
421st Assault Aviation Regiment, original name of the Yugoslav 107th Mixed Aviation Regiment
421st Bombardment Squadron, inactive United States Air Force unit
421st Fighter Squadron (421 FS), part of the 388th Fighter Wing at Hill Air Force Base, Utah

See also
421 (number)
421, the year 421 (CDXXI) of the Julian calendar
421 BC